Abiodun Falodun is a professor of pharmaceutical chemistry from Nigeria. He was the Deputy Vice Chancellor (Academics) of the University of Benin and currently the Rector of Edo State Polytechnic, Usen. He was appointed by the Governor of Edo state, Godwin Obaseki and sworn in on April 4, 2018 .

Education 
Falodun holds a Bachelor's degree in Pharmacy from the University of Benin (1996). He received his Master's degree in 2003 and his PhD in Pharmaceutical chemistry from the University of Benin in 2007.

Career 
Falodun started off as an assistant lecturer in 1999 at the Department of Pharmacy, University of Benin. He was an associate professor in 2011 and was awarded professor of Pharmaceutical Chemistry in 2014.

He was Head of Department of Pharmaceutical Chemistry at the University of Benin. He is a member of the Pharmaceutical Society of Nigeria, Institute of Public Analysts of Nigeria, Phytochemical Society of Europe, Swiss Chemical Society, and American Chemical Society.

He is a member of the Natural Product Research Group (NPRG) research group involved in bioactivity guided isolation, characterization, structure determination and optimization through synthesis of compounds from natural products mostly of plant origin.

He has written and published several research works, journals, reviews and books.

He is the Editor-in-Chief for Tropical Journal of Natural Product Research.

He is currently the pioneer coordinator, Center for Distance Learning at the University of Benin. He was also appointed as Director for Benson Idahosa University Distance Learning School (BIU-DLS).

Falodun was the Deputy Vice Chancellor (Academics) serving with Vice Chancellor F. F. O. Orumwense at the University of Benin.

Currently, he is the Rector of Edo State Polytechnic, Usen.

Awards 
 May and Baker Professional Service Award 2007
 Fulbright Senior Scholar, Faculty of Pharmacy, University of Mississippi, USA, 2013-2014
 Africa-US Network Centers of Excellence in Water and Environmental Science and Technology (2011 - 2015)

Personal life 
Falodun is married to Ehizogie Joyce Falodun with four children.

References

External links 

 of Tropical Journal of Natural Product Research
 of uniben
 of Edo State Polytechnic

Living people
Academic staff of the University of Benin (Nigeria)
University of Benin (Nigeria) alumni
Year of birth missing (living people)